Kim Raisner (born December 30, 1972, in West Berlin) is a retired modern pentathlete from Germany. She competed at the 2004 Summer Olympics in Athens, Greece, where she finished fifth in the women's event with a score of 5,312 points. She won the bronze medal in the 1999 world modern pentathlon world championships.

Since retirement in 2005, Raisner has coached her national women's modern pentathlon team and worked as a physiotherapist. She was head coach to 2008 Summer Olympics champion Lena Schöneborn.

Raisner was disqualified from the 2020 Summer Olympics after punching a horse which refused to jump for German rider Annika Schleu. She also instructed Schleu herself to hit the horse, allegedly using the words "really hit it". The sport's governing body stated that it 'had reviewed video footage that showed Ms Raisner appearing to strike the horse Saint Boy'.

References

External links
 

1972 births
Living people
Animal cruelty incidents
German female modern pentathletes
Olympic modern pentathletes of Germany
Modern pentathletes at the 2004 Summer Olympics
Sportspeople from Berlin
World Modern Pentathlon Championships medalists
German physiotherapists